Héctor E. Sánchez Barba  is the former executive director of the Labor Council for Latin American Advancement (LCLAA) and chair emeritus of the National Hispanic Leadership Agenda.

As of May 4, 2014, Sanchez was named as a director of Planned Parenthood Global.

References

University of Texas at El Paso alumni
Activists for Hispanic and Latino American civil rights
Living people
American trade union leaders
Year of birth missing (living people)